In Tibetan cuisine, Xab Pagri is a patty, usually made of baked dough, stuffed with meat paste.

See also
 List of Tibetan dishes

References

Tibetan cuisine